Sandra Hüller (born 30 April 1978) is a German actress. She gained critical praise for her portrait of Anneliese Michel in Hans-Christian Schmid's drama Requiem (2006), and is best known internationally for her starring role in Maren Ade's comedy Toni Erdmann (2016). Besides Julia Jentsch, Nina Hoss and Paula Beer she is the only German actress to win either the European Film Award or the Silver Bear for Best Actress, top honors of the European Film Academy and Berlin Film Festival, in the 21st century. Hüller has starred in German, Austrian, British and French films.

Life and career
Hüller was born in Suhl, East Germany. She studied theater from 1996 to 2000 at the Hochschule Für Schauspielkunst "Ernst Busch", Berlin. She appeared from 1998 to 2001 at the Jena Theater, Thuringia and then for one year at the Schauspiel Leipzig. It was Oliver Held who recommended her to the Theater Basel, Switzerland where she appeared until 2006.

Prior to the release of Toni Erdmann in 2016, Hüller was best known for her role as Michaela Klingler in Hans-Christian Schmid's film Requiem, for which she won the Berlin Film Festival Award for Best Actress in 2006. 

In 2014, she won the German Film Award for best supporting actress for her portrayal of Franziska Feldenhoven in Frauke Finsterwalder's film Finsterworld.

In 2019, she appeared in two French films, Justine Triet's Sibyl, where she played film director Mika, and in Alice Winocour's Proxima as the psychologist Wendy. 

Hüller portrayed Contess Irma Sztáray in Frauke Finsterwalder's upcoming film Sisi & I, a retelling of the later years of Empress Elisabeth of Austria from the point of view of her lady-in-waiting, Irma Sztáray. The film will premiere at the 73rd Berlin Film Festival on 19 February 2023, and it is scheduled to be released in Germany on 30 March 2023.

Filmography

Film

Television

Awards and nominations

 Gertrud-Eysoldt-Ring (2019)
 Order of Merit of the Federal Republic of Germany (2020)

References

External links

 

21st-century German actresses
Living people
1978 births
People from Suhl
German film actresses
German stage actresses
German television actresses
European Film Award for Best Actress winners
Best Actress German Film Award winners
Silver Bear for Best Actress winners
Ernst Busch Academy of Dramatic Arts alumni
Recipients of the Cross of the Order of Merit of the Federal Republic of Germany